Twiggs County Courthouse is a historic county courthouse in Jeffersonville, Georgia, county seat of Twiggs County, Georgia. The Romanesque Revival architecture building was designed by J.W. Golucke and built from 1902 to 1904. The previous courthouse had burned down in 1901. It was added to the National Register of Historic Places in 1980. It is located in Courthouse Square.  The square includes a Confederate soldier memorial.

Photos

See also
National Register of Historic Places listings in Twiggs County, Georgia

References

External links
 

Courthouses on the National Register of Historic Places in Georgia (U.S. state)
County courthouses in Georgia (U.S. state)
Government buildings completed in 1904
Romanesque Revival architecture in Georgia (U.S. state)
Buildings and structures in Twiggs County, Georgia
National Register of Historic Places in Twiggs County, Georgia
1904 establishments in Georgia (U.S. state)